The Nădrag (in its upper course also: Padeș) is a right tributary of the river Timiș in Romania. It discharges into the Timiș in Jdioara. Its source is in the Poiana Ruscă Mountains.

References

Rivers of Romania
Rivers of Timiș County